
Gerhard vom Berge or von Berg, also known as Gerhard of Schalksberg (died 15 November 1398), was a member of the vom Berge family, seated at Minden, and until 1397 the holders of the Vogtei rights over the bishopric of Minden. He was precentor and then dean in Minden Cathedral. He became Bishop of Verden from 1363 to 1365 and Bishop of Hildesheim from 1365 to his death on 15 November 1398.

In 1367 after winning the battle of Dinklar against Magnus I, Duke of Brunswick-Lüneburg (1345–1373), Gerhard built the imposing palas (residential structure including a great hall) at Burg Poppenburg (in the present Burgstemmen in Nordstemmen). He also founded Hildesheim Charterhouse in 1388.

Gerhard became involved in the War of the Lüneburg Succession (1371–1388), as a result of which the Welfs were obliged in 1380 to cede Burg Koldingen to him. Under his direction the fortress, situated on the left bank of the River Leine, became the seat of the newly-created Amt Koldingen within the territory of the bishopric of Hildesheim.

References

Further reading 
 Nathalie Kruppa, Jürgen Wilke (eds.): Die Hildesheimer Bischöfe von 1221 bis 1381 (Germania sacra. Historisch-statistische Beschreibung der Kirche des Alten Reiches / 46, Die Bistümer der Kirchenprovinz Mainz. Das Bistum Hildesheim 4). Berlin/New York 2006, pp. 481–604

External links 

 

Roman Catholic Prince-Bishops of Verden
Prince-Bishops of Hildesheim
Year of birth unknown
1398 deaths